The Three Musketeers in Africa is a novel written by a Hungarian novelist Jenő Rejtő under the pen name of P. Howard. It tells the story of Csülök, Senki Alfonz (Alfonz Nobody) and Tuskó Hopkins, the three legionaries of the French Foreign Legion. They have to deliver an important letter to Marquis De Surenne and protect a young lady called Yvonne Barre through the desert and lead her to a safe place. Although these three men are outlaws, they try to do everything to help people who are in need. This is a very exciting book with the unique humor of Jenő Rejtő.

Plot summary
Csülök, Senki Alfonz and Tuskó Hopkins the three legionaries live at the fortress of Oasis Rakhmar. Legionary Tuskó Hopkins serves by the name of Herman Torze because of a stolen uniform and data. He receives a letter from a young lady named Yvonne Barre addressed to Torze. She is in search for her brother, Francis Barre. The three legionaries find out that Francis is at the worst discipline camp, Igori. They want to help Yvonne, so each of the three commit some transgression to be punished by marching to Igori. There they face a big surprise as the discipline camp resembles to a resort centre. There they meet Yvonne, the dying Francis Barre and their father General Duron. Duron tries to unveil the fraud in a letter. The three legionaries and Yvonne escape from the camp carrying the letter to Marquis De Surenne. Finally the plot is unveiled and Senki Alfonz marries Yvonne.

Hungarian novels
French Foreign Legion in popular culture
1940 novels